Deborah Anne Wong (born 1959) is an American academic, educator, and ethnomusicologist. She is known for her studies of Asian-American and Thai music.

Early life and education
Wong was born on the east coast of the United States and now lives in California. She received a Bachelor of Arts in anthropology and music from the University of Pennsylvania in 1982. Wong later attended the University of Michigan, from which she earned her master's degree and then her PhD in 1991. She identifies as Chinese-American, Asian-American, and multi-ethnic.

Scholarship 
Wong has been a professor of music at the University of California, Riverside since 1996. She previously served as president of the Society for Ethnomusicology, and founded the Committee on the Status of Women with Elizabeth Tolbert in 1996. Wong is also the president of the Board of Directors for the Alliance for California Traditional Arts. She has served on the advisory council for the Smithsonian Center for Folklife and Cultural Heritage since 2011. Wong was nominated to be a member of the National Council on the Humanities by President Barack Obama in December 2015.

Asian-American studies
Wong focuses on Asian-American performance and the way it intersects with the racial imagination in America. She says, race is very much a part of our lives, America has racist structures that drive it, and looking at race when studying music is a different approach. She used a $10,000 grant from the California Council for the Humanities to help fund the research for the site, www.asianamericanriverside.ucr.edu. She wanted to spread the word about the little-known story of the city's lively Asian community. "Asian American Riverside" is a resource for local schools and the community. The project will help support interethnic understanding and strengthen community in Riverside.

Wong has studied taiko and is part of Satori Daiko, a performing group in Los Angeles.

Selected bibliography
 Wong's first book is about ritual performance and its implications for the cultural politics of Thai court music and dance in Bangkok in the late twentieth-century. 
 This book focuses on music and identity by looking at case studies.

Wong has also published on Chinese-American and Japanese-American jazz, Asian-American hip-hop, and Southeast-Asian immigrant music.

Research collectives
Wong has been a part of the oral history collective project Women Who Rock: Making Scenes, Building Communities.

References

Ethnomusicologists
University of Michigan alumni
University of California, Riverside faculty
Place of birth missing (living people)
American academics of Chinese descent
Living people
1959 births
American women academics
University of Pennsylvania School of Arts and Sciences alumni
American women anthropologists
21st-century American women